Zephyranthes carinata, commonly known as the rosepink zephyr lily or pink rain lily, is a perennial flowering plant native to Mexico, Colombia and Central America. It is also widely cultivated as an ornamental and naturalized in the West Indies, Peru, Argentina, Brazil, the southeastern United States from Texas to Florida, Zimbabwe, South Africa, China, Korea, the Ryukyu Islands, Assam, Nepal, Bhutan, Sri Lanka, Solomon Islands, Queensland, Society Islands, Kiribati, and Caroline Islands.

They are found naturally in moist, open areas, often near woodlands.

Like other rain lilies, their common name refers to their habit of blooming soon after a heavy rainfall. They are widely grown in gardens as annuals and as container plants, although they will overwinter in warm climates.

Zephyranthes carinata are often incorrectly referred to as Zephyranthes grandiflora, especially in horticulture.

Description
Zephyranthes carinata grows from tunicate globular bulbs  in diameter. The tunics are wine-red in color. Four to six linear and flattened leaves are produced by each bulb.

The funnel-shaped flowers are solitary, with pink to rose red perianths. The style is filiform.

The flowers develop into more or less spherical or three-lobed capsules. The seeds are shiny black and flattened.

Classification
Zephyranthes carinata belongs to the genus Zephyranthes (rain lilies)  of the tribe Hippeastreae. It is classified under the subfamily Amaryllidoideae of the Amaryllis family (Amaryllidaceae). In broader classifications, they are sometimes included within the lily family (Liliaceae).

Zephyranthes carinata is often referred to as Zephyranthes grandiflora, especially in horticulture. But the former was published earlier, hence Z. grandiflora is considered superfluous and illegitimate. Another name identified as an earlier synonym of Z. carinata is now considered to be a different species - Zephyranthes minuta.

Nomenclature
Zephyranthes carinata is also known as the 'rosepink rain lily', 'rosepink magic lily', or 'pink magic lily'. Like other rain lilies, their common name refers to their habit of blooming soon after a heavy rainfall. However, cultivated specimens of Z. carinata can be induced to flower all throughout the year by maintaining humidity.

They are one of the three species of Zephyranthes commonly known as 'pink rain lilies'. The other two are Zephyranthes rosea and Zephyranthes robusta. Z. rosea is a much smaller species with pink flowers that have green centers. H. robustus, on the other hand, have generally paler pink and more strongly bent flowers.

Non-English common names of Z. carinata include: 
 Chinese – Jiu lian，韭蘭(Tradition Chinese)
 French – petit lis rose, lis bordures
 German – großblütige Windblume
 Korean – Na-do-saf-ran
 Spanish – adelfa, Corazón de Maria, duende rosado, Lágrimas de María

Distribution and habitat
Zephyranthes carinata is native to Central America, from Mexico to Colombia. They have been introduced elsewhere and have become widely naturalized. They are usually found in open pastures and hill slopes.

Uses
Zephyranthes carinata are widely cultivated as ornamentals. They are able to survive colder temperatures than other species of Zephyranthes.

Chemical composition

It contains lycorine, galanthine, tazettine, haemanthamine, pretazetine, carinatine, tortuosine, trisphaeridine, hamayne and pancratistatin.

Toxicity
Like other species of Zephyranthes, Z. carinata contain toxic alkaloids including pretazettine, carinatine, lycorine, galantamine, and haemanthamine. If ingested, they can cause vomiting, convulsions, and death.

See also
Zephyranthes atamasca – the Atamasco lily
Zephyranthes candida – the white rain lily
Zephyranthes puertoricensis – the Puerto Rican zephyr lily

References

External links
 
 

carinata
Garden plants
Plants described in 1825
Flora of Central America
Flora of Mexico
Flora of Colombia

zh:韭莲